Dacrymyces is a genus of fungi in the family Dacrymycetaceae. Species are saprotrophs and occur on dead wood. Their distribution is worldwide. Basidiocarps (fruit bodies) are ceraceous to gelatinous, often yellow to orange, and typically disc-shaped to cushion-shaped. 

The genus has traditionally been differentiated from other genera in the Dacrymycetaceae on the basis of basidiocarp morphology, following (in recent years) the monograph of New Zealand mycologist Robert McNabb. Molecular research, based on cladistic analysis of DNA sequences, has however shown that morphology is not a good indicator of natural relationships within the Dacrymycetaceae. As a result several species formerly referred to Dacrymyces have been moved to Dacryonaema or Dendrodacrys.

Species
Dacrymyces adpressus
Dacrymyces albidus
Dacrymyces ancyleus
Dacrymyces ancoratus
Dacrymyces aquaticus
Dacrymyces aureosporus
Dacrymyces australis
Dacrymyces capitatus
Dacrymyces ceraceus
Dacrymyces chiangraiensis
Dacrymyces chrysocomus
Dacrymyces chrysospermus
Dacrymyces citrinus
Dacrymyces cokeri
Dacrymyces confluens
Dacrymyces corticioides
Dacrymyces coryneoides
Dacrymyces cupularis
Dacrymyces cylindricus
Dacrymyces cyrtosporus
Dacrymyces dacryomitriformis
Dacrymyces dictyosporus
Dacrymyces duii
Dacrymyces enatus
Dacrymyces estonicus
Dacrymyces falcatus
Dacrymyces flabelliformis
Dacrymyces grandinioides
Dacrymyces intermedius
Dacrymyces invisibilis
Dacrymyces kobayasii
Dacrymyces kohyasanus
Dacrymyces lacrymalis
Dacrymyces longistipitatus
Dacrymyces marginatus
Dacrymyces microsporus
Dacrymyces minor
Dacrymyces minutus
Dacrymyces nigrescens
Dacrymyces novae-zelandiae
Dacrymyces olivei
Dacrymyces ovisporus
Dacrymyces pachysporus
Dacrymyces parastenosporus
Dacrymyces pedunculatus
Dacrymyces pinacearum
Dacrymyces pulchrus
Dacrymyces punctiformis
Dacrymyces san-augustinii
Dacrymyces sichuanensis
Dacrymyces stenosporus
Dacrymyces stillatus
Dacrymyces subantarcticensis
Dacrymyces subarcticus 
Dacrymyces suecicus
Dacrymyces tortus
Dacrymyces variisporus
Dacrymyces yunnanensis

References

Dacrymycetes
Taxa named by Christian Gottfried Daniel Nees von Esenbeck